Corona is an unincorporated community in Oregon County, in the U.S. state of Missouri.

History
A post office called Corona was established in 1900, and remained in operation until 1906. The name most likely alludes to the color of a nearby spring.

References

Unincorporated communities in Oregon County, Missouri
Unincorporated communities in Missouri